AnnaLinden Weller, better known under her pen name Arkady Martine (born April 19, 1985), is an American historian, city planner, and author of science fiction literature. Her first novels A Memory Called Empire (2019) and A Desolation Called Peace (2021), which form the Teixcalaan series, each won the Hugo Award for Best Novel.

Personal life
Weller was born and grew up in New York City. She lives in Santa Fe, New Mexico with her wife, the author Vivian Shaw.  Her parents are classical musicians of Russian Jewish heritage: her mother is a professor of violin at Juilliard and her father played for the orchestra of the Metropolitan Opera; she has described herself as an "assimilated American Jew" and noted that, in the 1930s, Jews who moved to the United States from Europe "were basically playing classical music and inventing the Anglophone discipline of science fiction at the same time". She is also a climate activist.

Academic career
Weller obtained a Bachelor of Arts in religious studies at the University of Chicago in 2007, a Master of Studies in classical Armenian studies at the University of Oxford in 2013, and a Ph.D. in medieval Byzantine, global, and comparative history at Rutgers University in 2014. Her dissertation was titled "Imagining Pre-Modern Empire: Byzantine Imperial Agents Outside the Metropole". She was a visiting assistant professor of history at St. Thomas University from 2014–15 and a postdoctoral researcher at Uppsala University from 2015–17. She has published writings on the topic of Byzantine and medieval Armenian history.

Fiction writing
As Arkady Martine, Weller has been publishing science fiction since 2012.

A Memory Called Empire

Martine's first novel, A Memory Called Empire, published in 2019, is the beginning of her Teixcalaan series. It is set in a future where the Teixcalaanli empire governs most of human space, and is about to absorb Lsel, an independent mining station. Lsel ambassador Mahit Dzmare is sent to the imperial capital to prevent this, and finds herself embroiled in the empire's succession crisis. Martine said that the book was in many respects a fictional version of her postdoctoral research on Byzantine imperialism on the frontier to Armenia in the 11th century, particularly the annexation of the Kingdom of Ani.

In The Verge, Andrew Liptak praised the novel as a "brilliant blend of cyberpunk, space opera, and political thriller", highlighting Martine's characterization and worldbuilding. In Locus, Russell Letson appreciated the novel's "absorbing and sometimes challenging blend of intrigue and anthropological imagination", as well as its sense of humor. Publishers Weekly and Kirkus Reviews both gave the novel a starred review, noting the facility with which Martine brought the worlds of her "gorgeously crafted diplomatic space opera" to life, and comparing Martine's novel to the works of Ann Leckie and Yoon Ha Lee.

A Desolation Called Peace 

The second installment of the Teixcalaan series, A Desolation Called Peace was first published in 2021. It picks up several months after the events of Empire. Mahit is back on Lsel station, Three Seagrass is promoted-but-bored on Teixcalaan, and the new emperor is on the throne. Mahit is trying to process all of the events of the previous book when she is quickly thrown into a series of political intrigues that forces her to leave the station with Three Seagrass, who shows up on Lsel Station to take Mahit to an outlying area of space to try to communicate with a species of incomprehensible aliens and avert a war of total destruction. Back on Teixcalaan, political schemes are brewing, and the very young heir to the throne is in the middle of them.

Awards and nominations 

 A Desolation Called Peace, Tor Books, 2021 - Winner 2022 Hugo Award for Best Novel, 2021 Nebula Award Finalist for Best Novel, 2022 Locus Award Finalist for Best Science Fiction Novel, Longlisted for the BSFA Award for Best Novel.
 A Memory Called Empire, Tor Books, 2019 - Winner 2020 Hugo Award for Best Novel, Winner 2020 Compton Crook Award for Best First Novel, 2020 Locus Award Finalist for Best First Novel, 2019 Nebula Award Finalist for Best Novel, Shortlisted for the 2020 Arthur C. Clarke Award.

Bibliography

Teixcalaan series
 A Memory Called Empire, Tor Books (2019) 
 A Desolation Called Peace, Tor Books (2021)

Short fiction
 "Lace Downstairs" (2012)
 "Nothing Must Be Wasted" (2014)
 "Adjuva" (2015)
 "City of Salt" (2015)
 "When the Fall Is All That's Left" (2015)
 "How the God Auzh-Aravik Brought Order to the World Outside the World" (2016)
 "'Contra Gravitatem (Vita Genevievis)'" (2016)
 "All the Colors You Thought Were Kings" (2016)
 "Ekphrasis" (2016)
 "Ruin Marble" (2017)
 "The Hydraulic Emperor" (2018)
 "Object-Oriented" (2018)
 "Just a Fire" (as by A. Martine) (2018)
 "Faux Ami" (as by A. Martine) (2019)
 "Labbatu Takes Command of the Flagship Heaven Dwells Within" (2019)
 "Life and a Day" (as by A. Martine) (2019)
 "A Desolation Called Peace" (excerpt) (2020)
 "A Being Together Amongst Strangers" (2020)

Poetry
 "Cloud Wall" (2014)
 "Abandon Normal Instruments" (2016)

Nonfiction
 "Everyone's World Is Ending All the Time: Notes on Becoming a Climate Resilience Planner at the Edge of the Anthropocene" (2019)

Reviews
 "Testament by Hal Duncan" (2015)
 "Report from Planet Midnight by Nalo Hopkinson" (2016)
 "The Djinn Falls in Love & Other Stories by Mahvesh Murad and Jared Shurin" (2017)
 "The Only Harmless Great Thing by Brooke Bolander" (2018)

References

External links

 

1985 births
21st-century American Jews
21st-century American women writers
21st-century American LGBT people
21st-century pseudonymous writers
American Byzantinists
American lesbian writers
American people of Russian-Jewish descent
American science fiction writers
Climate activists
Historians from Maryland
Historians from New York (state)
Hugo Award-winning writers
Jewish American academics
Jewish American novelists
Jewish American poets
Jewish American short story writers
LGBT Jews
Living people
People from Baltimore
People from New York City
Pseudonymous women writers
University of Chicago alumni
Women Byzantinists
Women medievalists
LGBT historians